Split subject may refer to:
 Subject (philosophy)#Continental philosophy
 Splitting (psychology)
 Active–stative alignment or split-subject alignment